Tommy J. Walz (born September 22, 1945) is an American politician in the state of Vermont. He is a member of the Vermont House of Representatives, sitting as a Democrat from the Washington-3 district, having been first elected in 2014.

References

1945 births
Living people
Bowdoin College alumni
Democratic Party members of the Vermont House of Representatives
21st-century American politicians